In the video game industry, 2021 saw the release of many new titles. The numerous delays in software and hardware releases due to the continuation of the COVID-19 pandemic heavily impacted development schedules, leading to several games being delayed into 2022 or even postponed indefinitely. Additionally, computer and console hardware were impacted by the combined effects of a semiconductor shortage (partially from post-COVID-19 effects) and a rising growth of bitcoin mining that strained the supply of critical components.

Top-rated games

Major awards

Critically acclaimed games
Metacritic is an aggregator of video game journalism reviews. It generally considers expansions and re-releases as separate entities.

Financial performance 
Of this, 52% of the revenue was attributed to the mobile game market and the larger growth over the prior year, 28% to the console games market (including hardware and software), and 20% to the personal computer market.

Largest markets 
According to market research firm Newzoo, the following countries were the largest video game markets in 2021.

Highest-grossing mobile games 
The following titles are the top ten highest-grossing mobile games of 2021.

Highest-grossing games in China 
The following titles were 2021's top six highest-grossing video games in China.

Best-selling premium games by region 
The following titles were 2021's top ten best-selling premium games by region (excluding microtransactions and free-to-play titles) on PC and console platforms, for Japan, the United States, and Europe.

Major events

Notable deaths

 February 3 – Robert A. Altman, 73, co-founder and CEO of ZeniMax Media.
 March 11 – Gordon Hall, 51, co-founder of Rockstar Leeds.
 May 28 – Benoît Sokal, 66, creator of the Syberia series.
 June 4 – Ebbe Altberg, ca. 57, CEO of Linden Lab, creators of Second Life.
 ca. June 27 – "Near" aka "Byuu", ca. 38, developer of the higan emulator for the Super Nintendo Entertainment System.
 ca. August – David Lawson, 62, co-founder of Imagine Software and Psygnosis
 September 12 – Brandon Ashur, 36, Minecraft YouTuber and livestreamer also known as Bashurverse.
 September 16 – Clive Sinclair, 81, founder of Sinclair Research, the company behind several early personal computers like the ZX Spectrum
 September 18 – Mick McGinty, 69, traditional artist for television, film, and video games, including artwork for Street Fighter II and other games in the 1980s and 1990s.
 September 30 – Koichi Sugiyama, 90, composer of the Dragon Quest series among others.
 October 16 – Hiroshi Ono, 64, graphic artist for Namco who did most of their pixel art for their early arcade games, and was otherwise known as "Mr Dotman".
 December 6 – Masayuki Uemura, 78, lead architect of the Nintendo Entertainment System and Super Nintendo Entertainment System.
 December 14 – Ian Hetherington, 69, co-founder of Imagine Software and Psygnosis, chairman of Evolution Studios and Realtime Worlds.
 December 28 – John Madden, 85, American football coach and commentator, and namesake of Electronic Arts' Madden NFL series.

Hardware releases
The list of game-related hardware released in 2021.

Game releases

Series with new entries
Series with new installments include Age of Empires, Alex Kidd, Alien, Angelique, Aragami, A-Train, Baldur's Gate, Battlefield, Big Brain Academy, Blaster Master, Blue Reflection, Bus Simulator, Bravely Default, The Caligula Effect, Call of Duty, Chivalry: Medieval Warfare, The Dark Pictures Anthology, Demon Slayer: Kimetsu no Yaiba, DC Super Hero Girls, Diablo, Disgaea, Doctor Who, Dragon Quest, Drakengard, Dynasty Warriors, Everspace, Evil Genius, Far Cry,  Final Fantasy, Five Nights at Freddy's, Forza, Ghosts 'n Goblins, Guardians of the Galaxy, Guilty Gear, Halo, Hitman, Hot Wheels, The House of the Dead, The Idolmaster, King's Bounty, Jurassic Park, League of Legends, The Legend of Heroes, Life Is Strange, Little Nightmares, Little Tail Bronx, Lone Echo, Mario Golf, Mario Party, Megami Tensei, Metroid, Monster Hunter, No More Heroes, Oddworld, Pac-Man, Psychonauts, Ratchet & Clank, Resident Evil, Rune Factory, R-Type, Samurai Warriors, Sniper: Ghost Warrior, Star Wars, Stronghold, Story of Seasons, Subnautica, Super Mario, Syberia, System Shock, Tales, Vampire: The Masquerade, Wario, Werewolf: The Apocalypse, The World Ends with You, Wonder Boy, and Yakuza.

January–March

April–June

July–September

October–December

Video game-based film and television releases

Discontinued games
 Skylar & Plux: Adventure on Clover Island (Win, PS4, XBO)

See also
2021 in games

Notes

References

 
Video games by year